Ahmad Ali Khan Dreshak is a Pakistani politician who remained a Member of the Provincial Assembly of the Punjab from September 2013 to May 2018, and from August 2018 to January 2023.

Early life 
He was born on 1 January 1979.

Political career

He was elected to the Provincial Assembly of the Punjab as a candidate of Pakistan Tehreek-e-Insaf (PTI) from Constituency PP-243 (Dera Ghazi Khan-IV) in by-polls held in August 2013.

He was re-elected to Provincial Assembly of the Punjab as a candidate of PTI from Constituency PP-290 (Dera Ghazi Khan-VI) in 2018 Pakistani general election.

References

Living people
Baloch politicians
Punjab MPAs 2013–2018
1979 births
Pakistan Tehreek-e-Insaf MPAs (Punjab)
Ahmad Ali Khan
Punjab MPAs 2018–2023